Team Seas, stylized as #TEAMSEAS, is an international collaborative fundraiser that was started by YouTubers MrBeast and Mark Rober as a follow up to Team Trees. The fundraiser succeeded in raising over 33 million U.S. dollars. All of the donations from the fundraiser go to the Ocean Conservancy and the Ocean Cleanup, with the organisations splitting the donations. The fundraiser pledges to remove  of marine debris from the ocean by removing  of marine debris from the ocean for every 1 dollar donated. , $33,285,195 has been raised.

Background 

The preceding fundraiser, Team Trees, was started on October 25, 2019, by MrBeast and Mark Rober. They set to raise 20 million dollars, which was achieved. As of the start date of Team Seas, donations are still able to be made on the Team Trees website and planting progress is updated there.

Spread 
Team Seas aimed to remove  of marine debris from the ocean by the end of 2021 by raising 30 million dollars, with one pound removed for every dollar donated. The project was mass released over the internet on many different social media platforms on Friday October 29, 2021, at 1 PM (PT). On YouTube, 
thousands of creators from 145 countries, with a combined follow count of 1 billion, created videos about the fundraiser. Most creators explained the purpose of Team Seas and convinced viewers to donate to Team Seas throughout the entirety of their videos, while some added a short explanatory segment in theirs. Videos on TikTok also featured a donation sticker for the campaign.

MrBeast released a video on October 29, 2021, showing his team cleaning the polluted beaches of Bajos de Haina, Dominican Republic as volunteers for Ocean Conservancy. Mark Rober released a video on the same day, filmed with The Ocean Cleanup.

On November 1, 2021, Tobi Lütke, CEO of Shopify, donated $1,200,001, exceeding the $1,000,001 he donated to Team Trees.

References

External links

2021 in Internet culture
Hashtags
Fundraising events
Conservation projects
Ocean pollution
Internet activism
Charity fundraisers